Ntarama Genocide Memorial Centre is one of six genocide museums in Rwanda. Five thousand people were killed here in the Catholic church.

Location
Ntarama is located in Bugesera District. It is an hour's drive south of Kigali, the national capital and the largest city in the country.

Zaza and Sake are just to the south and Kibungo and Nyamata. Nemba Airport is close.

Overview

Ntarama's former Catholic church is now a memorial site. Five thousand people were massacred there on 15 April 1994 during the Rwandan genocide.

This memorial centre is one of six major centres in Rwanda that commemorate the Rwandan genocide. The others are the Murambi Memorial Centre, the Kigali Genocide Memorial Centre and others at Nyamata, Bisesero, and Nyarubuye.

References

External links

Genocide Archive of Rwanda 

Rwandan genocide museums
Museums in Rwanda
Rwandan genocide
Museums established in 2004
2004 establishments in Rwanda
Eastern Province, Rwanda